Eric Sheridan Prydz (born 19 July 1976), also known by his many aliases including Pryda and Cirez D, is a Swedish DJ and music producer. He rose to fame with his 2004 hit single "Call on Me", and saw continued chart success with "Proper Education" in 2007, "Pjanoo" in 2008, and "Opus" in 2015. In 2016, he released his debut studio album, Opus.

In 2017, he won DJ of the Year at the Electronic Music Awards and was also nominated for Live Act of the Year.

Career

2004–2008: "Call on Me" and Swedish House Mafia
Prydz is perhaps best known for his 2004 hit single "Call on Me". It topped the UK singles chart for five weeks and was number one on the German Top 100 for six consecutive weeks. Although this track made him immensely popular, Prydz has stopped playing it in his shows in an attempt to distance himself from it. In some respects he has succeeded, and with his newer songs, Prydz has gained recognition from both underground and mainstream fans. In 2006, he released a remixed version of Pink Floyd's "Another Brick in the Wall, Part 2", titled "Proper Education", with a video.

In 2008, Prydz released the critically acclaimed single "Pjanoo", which topped the UK Dance Chart.

Together with Axwell, Sebastian Ingrosso and Steve Angello, Prydz formed a group of DJs that informally referred to themselves as the Swedish House Mafia. When the group with the same name officially formed in late 2008, Prydz decided not to join his friends. He has collaborated with Axwell under the name Axer and with Angello as A&P Project.

2009–2013: Eric Prydz Presents Pryda
In 2009, Prydz released "Miami to Atlanta", where the "Pryda snare" was first used. The Pryda snare is a popular technique in house and trance music consisting of using a compressed and sustained snare sample at the end of a bar. Commonly used to mark progressions in a song structure, it has been widely sampled in the electronic dance music world, notably by producers such as Martin Garrix, Dimitri Vegas & Like Mike, and W&W.

On 21 May 2012, Prydz released his debut artist album, Eric Prydz Presents Pryda, as a 3-disc album on Virgin Records (Astralwerks in the USA). Disc 1 is made up of new unreleased Pryda productions, which some fans may have heard as works in progress (including Shadows, Agag, Mighty Love, Allein and the intro edit of Pjanoo). Discs 2 and 3 bring together many of the classic tracks from the Pryda catalogue, sequenced and continuously mixed by the man himself, including some of his special re-edits.

The Ministry of Sound club in London hosted the launch of Eric Prydz Presents Pryda on 14 April 2012, where Prydz played some of the tracks from the album. Inserting the CD in a computer and visiting Prydz's Facebook page provides access to a download of 'Tijuana', a track previously known as 'Space Miami ID' in .WAV format.

His 2013 Essential Mix was named Essential Mix of the Year by Pete Tong.

2014–present: PR(10)DA, PR(15)DA EPs and Opus

2014 was the 10th year of Prydz's label Pryda Recordings, and as a result, on 9 January 2014, Prydz announced a special upcoming artist album which was initially due for release later that year. On 4 May 2015, Prydz announced PR(10)DA, a collection of unreleased tracks from January 2004 to December 2014. PR(10)DA was released over three EPs, leading up to an album release in February 2016.

On 19 May 2014, Prydz announced via social media the third installment of his concert, Eric Prydz in Concert, titled EPIC 3.0. Promising the 'world's largest indoor hologram', new music, and new visuals, the show was to be held at Madison Square Garden during the Fall. Prydz performed his EPIC 3.0 show on 27 September 2014, playing a large range of new and unreleased material. The show incorporated a 20m, 4K hologram, and 32 lasers.

On 4 July 2015, Prydz was the first DJ with a set featured as a "One Mix" on Beats 1, the worldwide radio station on Apple Music.

On 5 February 2016, Prydz released his debut studio album Opus. In October 2015, Kieran Hebden released a remix of the title track under his pseudonym, Four Tet.

On 28 June 2016, Prydz collaborated with Luke Versalko from Mashable to produce a short documentary that details the making of his Epic 4.0 show. In June 2016, he also appeared on Insomniacs Night Owl Radio.

To celebrate the 15th anniversary of the Prydz' Pryda alias, on 10 April 2019 he announced the release of PR(15)DA, a collection of 27 songs.

On 19 July 2019, Prydz announced EPIC 6.0. This instalment of his EPIC series involved a multi-story eight-meter-wide transparent LED holosphere, which surrounded Prydz during his performance at Tomorrowland festival. The sphere was made up of seventy-two interlocking handmade panels, which contained over 2.4 million LEDs to illuminate with galaxies, darts of electricity, and alien planets.

Personal life
Aside from producing music, Prydz also runs the record labels Pryda, Pryda Friends, Pryda Presents and Mouseville, which release most of his own music. On Pryda, he releases music as Pryda. On Mouseville Records, started in 2002, he releases techno tracks as Cirez D. Prydz has a fear of flying, which means he mainly tours on a bus. He moved from London to Los Angeles in 2012, where he lived until his return to Sweden in 2021 after getting divorced from his former wife Sofie, with whom he has two children.

Discography 

Studio albums
 Opus (2016)

DJ Magazine Top 100

References

External links

 
 

1976 births
Club DJs
Living people
Remixers
Virgin Records artists
Astralwerks artists
Swedish dance musicians
Musicians from Stockholm
Swedish house musicians
Ministry of Sound artists
Swedish male musicians
Swedish DJs
Swedish expatriates in the United States
Swedish expatriates in the United Kingdom
Progressive house musicians
Revealed Recordings artists
Electronic dance music DJs
Arista Records artists